Tin Yat Estate is a public housing estate in Tin Shui Wai, New Territories, Hong Kong, near Light Rail Tin Yat stop. It consists of nine residential buildings completed in 2001.

Background
According to the Hong Kong Directory published in 2001, Tin Yat Estate was originally a Home Ownership Scheme housing estate known as Yat Tin Court, but there is a difference in the housing estates in Tin Shui Wai, the word "Tin" is usually placed in front. Later, because the government planned to shorten the waiting period for public housing to three years, the entire batch of housing estates in Phase 23B, including Yat Tin Court, were converted into public housing for lease.

Houses

Demographics
According to the 2016 by-census, Tin Yat Estate had a population of 14,589. The median age was 32.6 and the majority of residents (96.2 per cent) were of Chinese ethnicity. The average household size was 4.4 people. The median monthly household income of all households (i.e. including both economically active and inactive households) was HK$29,000.

Politics
For the 2019 District Council election, the estate fell within two constituencies. Most of the estate is located in the Yat Chak constituency, which is represented by Wong Wing-sze. The remainder falls within the Wang Yat constituency, which is represented by Mo Kai-hong.

See also

Public housing estates in Tin Shui Wai

References

Tin Shui Wai
Public housing estates in Hong Kong
Residential buildings completed in 2001